Empicoris orthoneuron is a species of thread-legged bug in the family Reduviidae. It is found in Central America, North America, and South America.

References

Further reading

 
 
 
 
 
 
 

Reduviidae
Insects described in 1925